William Marshall Tredway (August 24, 1807 – May 1, 1891) was a U.S. Representative from Virginia.

Early life
Born near Farmville in Prince Edward County, Virginia, Tredway completed preparatory studies.
He was graduated from Hampden-Sydney College, Prince Edward County, Virginia, in 1827.

Career
After college studies, Tredway studied law, was admitted to the bar in 1830 and commenced practice in Danville, Virginia.

Tredway was elected as a Democrat to the Twenty-ninth Congress (March 4, 1845 – March 3, 1847) with 57.34% of the vote, defeating Whig John D. Cheatham. He was an unsuccessful candidate for reelection in 1846 to the Thirtieth Congress.

He served as delegate to the Democratic State convention in 1850.

In 1850, Tredway was elected to the Virginia Constitutional Convention of 1850. He was one of six delegates elected from the Southside delegate district made up of his home district of Pittsylvania County, as well as Halifax, and Mecklenburg Counties.

He served as member of the secession convention of Virginia in 1861. A conditional Unionist, he voted against secession on April 4 and for secession on April 17 following Lincoln's call for state militia to restore seized Federal property.

Tredway served as judge of the circuit court of Virginia 1870-1879. He resumed the practice of law in Chatham, Virginia.

Death
William Marshall Tredway died on May 1, 1891, in Chatham, Virginia. He was interred in Chatham Cemetery.

See also
William Tredway (Canadian politician)

References

Bibliography

External links

1807 births
1891 deaths
People from Prince Edward County, Virginia
Virginia lawyers
Politicians from Danville, Virginia
People from Chatham, Virginia
Virginia Secession Delegates of 1861
Democratic Party members of the United States House of Representatives from Virginia
19th-century American politicians
19th-century American lawyers